Gary Murphy (born 26 May 1948) is a New Zealand cricketer. He played in one List A match for Northern Districts in 1973/74.

See also
 List of Northern Districts representative cricketers

References

External links
 

1948 births
Living people
New Zealand cricketers
Northern Districts cricketers
Cricketers from Lower Hutt